Peter Van der Heyden (born 16 July 1976) is a Belgian former professional footballer who played as a left-back.

Club career
Van der Heyden was born in Aalst, East Flanders. His former clubs include F.C. Denderleeuw, Eendracht Aalst, VfL Wolfsburg and 1. FSV Mainz 05. On 21 January 2010, the Belgian Jupiler Pro League outfit Club Brugge signed him until 2011, it is his second spell at the club after previously being a squad member between 2000 and 2005.

International career
Van der Heyden played 21 times with Belgium and was in the team for the 2002 World Cup. He scored Belgium's second goal in their opening match, a 2–2 draw with Japan in Saitama.

Career statistics
Scores and results list Belgium's goal tally first, score column indicates score after each Van der Heyden goal.

Honours 
Club Brugge
 Belgian First Division: 2002–03, 2004–05
 Belgian Cup: 2001–02, 2003–04; runners-up 2004–05
 Belgian Supercup: 2002, 2003, 2004
 Bruges Matins:  2000, 2001, 2004
 Jules Pappaert Cup: 2005

Belgium
 FIFA Fair Play Trophy: 2002 World Cup

References

External links
 
 
 

1976 births
Living people
Sportspeople from Aalst, Belgium
Footballers from East Flanders
Belgian footballers
Association football fullbacks
Belgium international footballers
Flemish sportspeople
S.C. Eendracht Aalst players
Club Brugge KV players
VfL Wolfsburg players
1. FSV Mainz 05 players
Beerschot A.C. players
2002 FIFA World Cup players
Bundesliga players
2. Bundesliga players
Belgian Pro League players
Challenger Pro League players
Belgian expatriate footballers
Belgian expatriate sportspeople in Germany
Expatriate footballers in Germany